Finley the Fire Engine is a 2007 British CGI animated children's television series produced by Balley Beg Animation Studios in Douglas, Isle of Man.

Synopsis
The show is about talking vehicles in a fictional town called Friendlyville. 78 episodes have been aired, each running for 15 minutes. A British dub of the series was shown in Britain by the BBC's children's channel, CBeebies, from 23 July 2007 until 30 November 2012, with the voice recording studio and final mix being provided by Ten Pin Alley Limited. The show also aired on ABC in Australia from 18 March 2008 until 4 May 2014.

The US dub from 2009 features the voices of Matt Hill (Miguel), Maggie Blue O'Hara (DJ), Reece Thompson (Finley), Chantal Strand (Jesse), Lee Tockar (Gorby), Andrea Libman (Isabelle), Danny McKinnon (Scooty), and Teryl Rothery (Abigail).

Characters

Main
Finley is a red male fire engine. He is good-willed and generous, lives in Fire Station No. 5, and loves nothing better than having fun with his highway pals. He sometimes sleeps with his teddy bear, Diesel. He is voiced by Callum Hanks in the UK and Reece Thompson in the US.
Dex (sometimes known as Dexter) is a blue male dump truck who is the semi-anti hero of the show. Despite being a bit of a bully, Dex has a softer side and is grateful for Finley's kindness towards him. He is voiced by Jay Simon in the UK and Andrew Francis in the US.
Captain Parker is a senior male fire engine and Finley's older brother, who always keeps the gang in check. He is based on 1951 Mack fire truck. He is voiced by Dean Smith in the US and Justin Fletcher in the UK.
DJ is a female orange front end loader who enjoys nothing better than digging. It reveals in "Lights Out" that she sometimes sucks her scooper when she goes to sleep. She is voiced by Janet James in the UK and Maggie Blue O'Hara in the US.
Jesse is a yellow-and-pink female tow truck with a siren shaped like a bow and a red nose. She is usually timid and shy, but is always ready and raring to come to the rescue. She is voiced by Janet James in the UK and Chantal Strand in the US.
Isabelle is a green-and-purple female ice cream van who is very polite, bubbly, lovable and cheerful. She is voiced by Emma Tate in the UK and Andrea Libman in the US.
Abigail is a white female ambulance who is kind, gentle, and sweet. She is voiced by Janet James in the UK and Teryl Rothery in the US.
Miguel is a silver male mail truck who is very professional and organized. In "Lights Out", it is revealed that he sleeps with his parking lights on. He is voiced by Justin Fletcher in the UK and Matt Hill in the US.
Gorby is a green male recycling truck who is Finley's best friend. He can be a bit cheeky and goofy however, he is hard-working, reliable, and dutiful. He is voiced by Kyle Bielfield in the UK and Lee Tockar in the US.
Scooty is a yellow male school bus and Miguel's best friend who can get a bit nervous. He is voiced by Emma Tate in the UK and Danny McKinnon in the US.
Hubert is a blue-and-white male police car who solves mysteries. He is voiced by Justin Fletcher in the UK and David Paul Grove in the US.
Scout is a male Dalmatian who is both Finley's best friend and also the latter and Captain Parker's pet Dalmatian with a few blue spots on his white fur

Recurring
Carl is a blue male lorry. He is voiced by Michael Dobson in Canada.
Suds is a purple-and-pink male talking car wash. He is voiced by Michael Dobson in the US and Jay Simon in the UK.
Mr. Bell is a male yellow talking fire station bell who usually spends the day sleeping, although one time he couldn't do so, until he could finally get to sleep as Abigail squirts oil onto him. He is voiced by Kyle Bielfield in the UK and Lee Tockar in the US.
Lyle and Lois are talking fuel pumps. Lyle is male and blue, while Lois is female and orange. Lyle is voiced by Michael Dobson in the US and Jonty Stephens in the UK, while Lois is voiced by Janet James in the UK and Kathleen Barr in the US.
Polly is a silver female talking fireman's pole. She is voiced by Janet James in the UK and Kathleen Barr in the US.

References

External links
 Episode guide at BBC

British children's animated comedy television series
British preschool education television series
British computer-animated television series
2007 British television series debuts
2012 British television series endings
CBeebies
Animated preschool education television series
2000s preschool education television series
2010s preschool education television series
English-language television shows